Quasipaa robertingeri is a species of frog in the family Dicroglossidae. It is endemic to Southwest China and is known from southeastern Sichuan, Chonqing, and northern Guizhou. It is named in honor of Robert F. Inger, an American herpetologist and ichthyologist. Common name Hejiang spiny frog has been proposed for it.

A 2009 molecular study placed Quasipaa robertingeri in the synonymy of Quasipaa boulengeri, but another study in 2021 restored its species status; its status remains controversial.

It is threatened by over-harvesting for human consumption.

References

robertingeri
Frogs of China
Endemic fauna of China
Taxa named by Zhao Ermi
Amphibians described in 1995